The 1932 United States presidential election in Nebraska took place on November 8, 1932, as part of the 1932 United States presidential election. Voters chose seven representatives, or electors, to the Electoral College, who voted for president and vice president.

Nebraska was won by Governor Franklin D. Roosevelt (D–New York), running with Speaker John Nance Garner, with 62.98% of the popular vote, against incumbent President Herbert Hoover (R–California), running with Vice President Charles Curtis, with 35.29% of the popular vote.

As of 2020, this election marks the best ever Democratic presidential performance in Nebraska and the only time the state has given more than sixty percent of its vote to a Democrat in a presidential election. 1932 also constitutes the last occasion that the following counties voted for a Democratic presidential candidate: Antelope, Arthur, Brown, Furnas, Garden, Garfield, Hamilton, Hooker, Loup, McPherson, Otoe, Rock, Valley, or York. This was the last time that Nebraska voted more Democratic than the nation overall.

Results

Results by county

See also
 United States presidential elections in Nebraska

Notes

References

Nebraska
1932
1932 Nebraska elections